Zehnder is a German-language surname, mostly Swiss in origin:

Zehnder (surname)

It may also refer to the following:

Conley–Zehnder theorem, a mathematical theorem named after Charles C. Conley and Eduard Zehnder
Mach–Zehnder interferometer, a device used in physics
Egon Zehnder, a global executive search firm based in Switzerland
Zehnder Confair, American politician
Zehnder's, a large restaurant in Frankenmuth, Michigan